William Blamire Young (9 August 1862 – 14 January 1935), commonly known as Blamire Young, was an English/Australian artist who painted primarily in watercolour.

Biography

Early life
Young was born at Londesborough, Yorkshire, the second son of a family of 12. His father, Colonel Young, came of prosperous yeoman stock. Blamire Young was educated at the Forest School, Walthamstow, where he received a classical training, and going on to Cambridge University specialised in mathematics. That he completed his course with no better than third-class honours was no doubt partly caused by his discovery of the print collection in the Fitzwilliam Museum, and his association with the Cambridge Fine Art Society. It had been intended that he should become a clergyman, but Young felt that he had no vocation for that work and obtained the position of mathematical master at Katoomba College, Katoomba, New South Wales, which had been founded by John Walter Fletcher in 1884. Young remained at the school for eight years. In his spare time he practised painting, and meeting Phil May received some instruction from him in painting in oil.

Artistic work
In 1893, he returned to England and after working for a few months under Hubert von Herkomer, became associated with James Pryde and William Nicholson in poster work. In 1895 Young returned to Australia and with the Lindsay brothers and Harry Weston did some excellent posters. But the field was limited and many years of poverty followed, during which a certain amount of writing was done for the press. He began exhibiting at the Victorian Artists' Society, but sales were few and the one-man show was then unknown. During his visit to England he had married Mabel Sawyer, an expert wood-carver, and while the lean period lasted Mrs Young helped to keep the house going by executing commissions for Melbourne architects. It was not until 1911 that the appreciation of Young's art really began to be shown. In that year he held an exhibition at Melbourne of small pictures, some of which had similar qualities to the Japanese coloured wood-cuts of the eighteenth century. Sales were good, partly because the prices were low, and the artist was sufficiently encouraged to hold an exhibition at Adelaide. This was both an artistic and a financial success, other shows followed in Melbourne and Sydney, and at last, in his fiftieth year, Young's reputation as an artist was established.

In 1911 he was commissioned by the Postmaster-General of Australia, C E Frazer, to produce new designs for the first Commonwealth of Australia stamps. He submitted the designs in January 1912. Three types of printed essays for the Kangaroo and Map stamps are known. This design was first issued on 2 January 1913 and continued to be in use till 1935 concurrently with other stamps. The design was also used on postal stationery envelopes, letter cards, registration envelopes and newspaper wrappers.

Later years
In 1912 he sailed for Europe and after a stay in Spain settled in England. Eighteen months later in August 1914 his first show, opened at the Bailey Galleries. All the arrangements had been made and the pictures hung when war broke out. Young had been a good marksman in his youth, and for three years worked as an instructor in musketry and machine-gunnery. Immediately after the war he took up his painting again and exhibited at the Academy and the Royal Society of British Artists. Back in Australia in 1923 Young established himself at Montrose in the hills about 20 miles east of Melbourne. He acted as art critic for The Herald and held occasional one-man shows. His position was now secure, and he was recognised everywhere as one of the leading artists in water-colour in Australia. He died at Montrose and was survived by his wife and two daughters.

In addition to his newspaper writings he published a one-act play The Children's Bread in 1912, and in 1923 The Proverbs of Goya, an interesting attempt to disclose the inner meaning of Goya's series of etchings known as Los disparates. Another one-act play, Art for Arts Sake, was produced at the Melbourne Repertory Theatre in 1911.

Legacy
In 1976 he was honoured on a postage stamp issued by Australia Post  for his work as designer of the first Australian postage stamp.

Gallery

References

Further reading

 Marshall, Stephen (2013), The Watercolours of Blamire Young, Sydney: Meridian Publishing
 Marshall, Stephen (2013), "Blamire Young". Design and Art Australia Online, http://www.daao.org.au/bio/blamire-young/biography/
 Marshall, Stephen (2014), "Blamire Young". ancestry.com.au, http://trees.ancestry.com.au/tree/32998497/person/18369110460

1862 births
1935 deaths
Australian art critics
Australian watercolourists
British stamp designers
Australian stamp designers
19th-century English painters
20th-century English painters
English male painters
English emigrants to Australia
19th-century English male artists
19th-century Australian painters
20th-century Australian painters
20th-century English male artists